London Underground S Stock may refer to either of the following London Underground's suburban stock:
London Underground S Stock (ex-Metropolitan Railway)
London Underground S7 and S8 Stock
London Underground Standard Stock